The 2012 PartyPoker.net European Championship was the fifth edition of the Professional Darts Corporation tournament, the European Championship, which allows the top European players to compete against the highest ranked players from the PDC Order of Merit. The tournament took place from 20–23 September 2012 at the RWE-Sporthalle in Mülheim, Germany.

Phil Taylor was once again defending the title, after winning each of the four previous playings of this tournament since the inaugural edition in 2008. However, he lost for the first time in the quarter-finals 6–10 to Brendan Dolan.

Simon Whitlock won his first major title, defeating Wes Newton 11–5 in the final.

Prize money
The 2012 European Championship has a total prize fund of £200,000. The following is the breakdown of the fund:

Qualification
The top 16 players from the PDC Order of Merit after the two Players Championship events in Barnsley automatically qualified for the event. The top 8 from them were also the seeded players. The remaining 16 places went to the top 8 non-qualified players from the PDC Pro Tour Order of Merit, with further places awarded to the top 8 non-qualified players from the Continental Europe Order of Merit.

These are the participants: 
Fourth placed Gary Anderson was banned from the event due to breaching the PDC's rules at the 2012 German Darts Championship.

Draw and results
The draw was held on 9 September 2012.

Statistics
{|class="wikitable sortable" style="font-size: 95%; text-align: right"
|-
! Player
! Played
! Legs Won
! Legs Lost
! LWAT
! 100+
! 140+
! 180s
! High checkout
! 3-dart average
|-
|align="left"|  Simon Whitlock
|5
|48
|28
|15
|99
|52
|19
|167
|96.19
|-
|align="left"|  Wes Newton
|5
|42
|32
|14
|88
|45
|28
|129
|94.78
|-
|align="left"|  Kim Huybrechts
|4
|35
|28
|12
|74
|37
|20
|164
|93.76
|-
|align="left"|  Brendan Dolan
|4
|35
|25
|11
|93
|37
|10
|106
|89.40
|-
|align="left"|  Raymond van Barneveld
|3
|24
|20
|10
|57
|38
|11
|156
|103.37
|-
|align="left"|  Phil Taylor
|3
|22
|20
|6
|49
|18
|6
|164
|93.31
|-
|align="left"|  Colin Lloyd
|3
|23
|21
|12
|51
|41
|8
|164
|92.49
|-
|align="left"|  Andy Hamilton
|3
|23
|18
|8
|52
|20
|8
|160
|91.08
|-
|align="left"|  Michael van Gerwen
|2
|15
|15
|5
|37
|22
|10
|128
|102.19
|-
|align="left"|  Ian White
|2
|11
|10
|5
|25
|16
|5
|104
|96.33
|-
|align="left"|  Richie Burnett
|2
|14
|13
|7
|32
|22
|8
|130
|93.39
|-
|align="left"|  Kevin Painter
|2
|11
|14
|4
|38
|15
|4
|134
|92.44
|-
|align="left"|  Ronnie Baxter
|2
|14
|11
|5
|30
|21
|6
|138
|89.93
|-
|align="left"|  Andree Welge
|2
|11
|14
|3
|34
|18
|0
|130
|89.19
|-
|align="left"|  Jerry Hendriks
|2
|13
|12
|4
|31
|17
|5
|142
|89.05
|-
|align="left"|  Dave Chisnall
|2
|11
|13
|4
|36
|11
|6
|167
|87.67
|-
|align="left"|  Andy Smith
|1
|5
|6
|1
|10
|12
|3
|98
|95.68
|-
|align="left"|  Mervyn King
|1
|4
|6
|1
|9
|9
|2
|84
|96.49
|-
|align="left"|  Mark Webster
|1
|4
|6
|1
|12
|5
|3
|84
|91.35
|-
|align="left"|  Vincent van der Voort
|1
|4
|6
|1
|11
|8
|1
|80
|89.96
|-
|align="left"|  Justin Pipe 
|1
|3
|6
|1
|11
|12
|1
|130
|96.48
|-
|align="left"|  James Wade
|1
|3
|6
|3
|7
|8
|3
|120
|93.44
|-
|align="left"|  Co Stompé
|1
|3
|6
|1
|12
|8
|0
|88
|90.13
|-
|align="left"|  Magnus Caris
|1
|3
|6
|1
|13
|9
|0
|38
|90.00
|-
|align="left"|  Gino Vos
|1
|3
|6
|1
|11
|6
|1
|56
|77.75
|-
|align="left"|  Mark Walsh
|1
|2
|6
|0
|10
|4
|1
|80
|84.55
|-
|align="left"|  Mensur Suljović
|1
|2
|6
|1
|8
|6
|0
|46
|81.09
|-
|align="left"|  Terry Jenkins
|1
|1
|6
|0
|10
|6
|1
|26
|92.13
|-
|align="left"|  Michael Rosenauer
|1
|1
|6
|0
|4
|2
|3
|59
|80.51
|-
|align="left"|  Adrian Lewis
|1
|0
|6
|0
|5
|8
|3
|–
|90.67
|-
|align="left"|  Tomas Seyler
|1
|0
|6
|0
|8
|6
|0
|–
|88.19
|-
|align="left"|  Paul Nicholson
|1
|0
|6
|0
|8
|3
|0
|–
|83.03

Broadcasts
The tournament was broadcast in the UK on ESPN.

References

External links
European Championship page on the PDC's official website

European Championship (darts)
European Championship
European Championship (darts)